Azara's spinetail (Synallaxis azarae) is a species of bird in the family Furnariidae, named after Spanish naturalist Félix de Azara.

Distribution and habitat
It is found in Argentina, Bolivia, Colombia, Ecuador, and Peru. Its natural habitats are subtropical or tropical dry forests, subtropical or tropical moist montane forests, and heavily degraded former forest.

References

Azara's spinetail
Birds of the Northern Andes
Azara's spinetail
Taxonomy articles created by Polbot